Újezd u Chocně is a municipality and village in Ústí nad Orlicí District in the Pardubice Region of the Czech Republic. It has about 300 inhabitants.

Administrative parts
Villages of Chloumek and Prochody are administrative parts of Újezd u Chocně.

References

Villages in Ústí nad Orlicí District